The Insurgency in Balochistan is an insurgency or revolt by Baloch nationalists and Islamist militants against the governments of Pakistan and Iran in the Balochistan region, which covers the Balochistan Province in southwestern Pakistan, Sistan and Baluchestan Province in southeastern Iran, and the Balochistan region of southern Afghanistan. Rich in natural resources like natural gas, oil, coal, copper, sulphur, fluoride and gold, this is the largest, least populated and least developed province in Pakistan. Armed groups demand greater control of the province's natural resources and political autonomy. Baloch separatists have attacked civilians from other ethnicities throughout the province. In the 2010s, attacks against the Shia community by sectarian groups—though not always directly related to the political struggle—have risen, contributing to tensions in Balochistan. In Pakistan, the ethnic separatist insurgency is low-scale but ongoing mainly in southern Balochistan, as well as sectarian and religiously motivated militancy concentrated mainly in northern and central Balochistan.

In Pakistan's Balochistan province, insurgencies by Baloch nationalists have been fought in 1948, 1958–59, 1962–63 and 1973–1977, with an ongoing low-level insurgency beginning in 2003. This insurgency has begun to weaken. In an article titled "The End of Pakistan's Baloch Insurgency?", Baloch analyst Malik Siraj Akbar reported that Baloch militants had begun killing their own commanders. Furthermore, separatists in recent times have also accused their own groups of being involved in wide spread crime, robbery and rapes against Baloch women, with some claiming that what started as an idealistic political fight for their people's rights has turned into gangs extorting, kidnapping and even raping locals. However, Akbar called anger towards provincial Chief Minister Abdul Malik Baloch "growing and often uncontrollable". Baloch militants have taken some reconciliation offers from the government and offered to hand in their weapons. In April 2016, four militant commanders and 144 militants had surrendered under reconciliation. 600 rebels were killed and 1,025 surrendered after accepting reconciliation as of August 2016. In April 2017, another 500 Baloch rebels surrendered to the state, including members of BRA, UBA, and LeB.

Baloch separatists argue they are economically marginalised and poor compared to the rest of Pakistan. China has invested $46 billion in the region. The Balochistan Liberation Army, designated as a terrorist organisation by Pakistan, the United Kingdom and the United States, is the most widely known Baloch separatist group. Since 2000 it has conducted numerous deadly attacks on Pakistani military troops, police, journalists, civilians and education institutions. Other separatist groups include Lashkar-e-Balochistan and the Balochistan Liberation United Front (BLUF).

By 2005, the insurgency by Baloch separatists had once again resurged in Iran. The fight over the Iranian Baloch region bordering Pakistan has "not gained" as much ground as the conflict in Pakistan. Though since the mass unrest in Iran following the death of Mahsa Amini in 2022, protests and unrest in Iran's Sistan and Baluchistan province have surged, resulting in a bloody crackdown by the Iranian regime on its Baloch population.Human rights activists have accused nationalist militants, Government of Pakistan and Iran of human rights abuses in its suppression of the insurgency.

The News International reported in 2012 that a Gallup survey conducted for DFID revealed that the most of the Balochistan province does not support independence from Pakistan, with only 37% of ethnic Baloch and 12% of Pashtuns in Balochistan favoring independence. However, 67% of Balochistan's population favored greater provincial autonomy, including 79% of ethnic Baloch and 53% of Pashtuns in the province.

Area of dispute
Historical Balochistan covers the southern part of the Iranian Sistan and Baluchestan Province in the west, the Pakistani province of Balochistan in the east, and, in the northwest, part of Afghanistan's Helmand Province. The Gulf of Oman forms its southern border. Mountains and desert make up much of the region's terrain. A majority of Baloch inhabit the region of Balochistan that predominantly falls within Pakistan's borders.

Geographically, Balochistan is the largest province of Pakistan (comprising 44% of the country's total area), but it is the least developed and least inhabited, comprising only 5% of the total population. Sunni Islam is the predominant religion throughout the Balochistan region.

Stuart Notholt, in his Atlas of Ethnic Conflict, describes the unrest in Balochistan as a "nationalist/self-determination conflict".

History

Background
The origins of the secessionist movement are believed to have started around the uncertainty regarding Khanate of Kalat, established in 1666 by Mir Ahmad. The Khanate of Kalat occupied central portions of territory in present day Balochistan, and was one of the four princely states of the modern day province under British rule, namely Makran, Las Bela, Kharan and Kalat.Under Nasir I of Kalat in 1758, who accepted the Afghan paramountcy, the boundaries of Kalat stretched up to Dera Ghazi Khan in the east and Bandar Abbas in the west. However, in November 1839, the British invaded Kalat, and the Khan was killed in action during the invasion. Afterwards, the British influence in the region gradually grew. In 1869, the British Political Agent Robert Groves Sandeman ended up mediating a dispute between the Khan of Kalat and the Sardars of Balochistan, and established the British primacy in the region. The tribal areas of Marri, Bugti, Khetran and Chaghi were brought under the direct administration of a British Agent, eventually to become the Chief Commissioner's Province of Balochistan. Lasbela and Kharan were declared Special Areas with a different political system. The remaining areas of Sarawan, Jhalawan, Kacchi and Makran were retained as the Khanate of Kalat, supervised by a Political Agent of Kalat.

In the 20th century, the educated Baloch middle class harboured hopes of their independence from British colonial rule. They formed a nationalist movement Anjuman-e-Ittehad-e-Balochistan in 1931. One of their first campaigns was to fight for the accession of Azam Jan as the Khan of Kalat and a constitutional government to be established under him. They were successful in establishing Azam Jan as the Khan but the new Khan sided with the Sardars and turned his back on the Anjuman. His successor Mir Ahmad Yar Khan was more sympathetic to Anjuman but he was averse to upsetting his relations with the British. The Anujman, transformed into the Kalat State National Party (KSNP), continued to fight for independence from the British. It was declared illegal by the Khanate in 1939 and its active leaders and activists were exiled. This paved the way for the formation of new political parties, Balochistan Muslim League allied to the Muslim League in June 1939 and Anjuman-i-Watan allied to the Indian National Congress in the same year. Led by Abdul Samad Khan Achakzai, the Anjuman-i-Water was opposed to the partition of India and wanted a united India after the country gained independence from Britain.

During British rule Balochistan was under the rule of a Chief Commissioner and did not have the same status as other provinces of British India. The Muslim League under Muhammad Ali Jinnah in the period 1927-1947 strived to introduce reforms in Balochistan to bring it on par with other provinces of British India.

During the time of the Indian independence movement, public opinion in Balochistan, at least in Quetta and other small towns in northern Balochistan, was overwhelmingly in favour of Pakistan. The pro-India Congress, which drew support from Hindus and some Muslims, sensing that geographic and demographic compulsions would not allow the province's inclusion into the newly Independent India, began to encourage separatist elements in Balochistan, and other Muslim majority provinces such as NWFP.

The Khan of Kalat lent great support to the Pakistan Movement but also desired to declare independence. Lord Mountbatten, however, made it clear that the princely states with the lapse of British paramountcy would have to join either India or Pakistan, keeping in mind their geographic and demographic compulsions.

On 19 July, Mountbatten called a Round Table Conference meeting between representatives of the State of Kalat and Government of Pakistan. Mountbatten discussed with them the status of the Kalat State. The representatives of Kalat argued that Kalat, as per the treaty of 1876, was an independent and sovereign state and not an Indian state. Mountbatten accepted this position for the purpose of negotiation, although Kalat had always been a princely state. Thus, Mountbatten confined the topic of discussion to the leased areas of Quetta, Nushki, Nasirabad and Bolan. He explained that Pakistan rejected Kalat's claims that these areas should be returned to Kalat.

Pakistan's position was that it would inherit all treaty obligations incurred by India to the foreign states. Kalat argued that the leases clearly stated that the other party besides Kalat was the British Government alone. Kalat argued that it was a personal agreement and there was no provision that the leases to the British would be inherited by others. Therefore, since the agreement was between Kalat and the British Government, Pakistan could not be the latter's successor party.

Pakistan did not agree that the agreement was personal as personal agreements by nature implied that only a particular person was involved. Mountbatten also said that according to international law, treaties such as the one being discussed were inherited by successors and not invalidated by a transfer of power. Mountbatten also suggested that in case there was no agreement the matter could be put before an Arbitral Tribunal.

Kalat wished to have further discussions on the matter. Kalat also argued that in case of a vote in the leased areas between joining Kalat and joining Pakistan then the vote would go in favour of the former. Pakistan did not agree that the vote would have such a result.

Kalat also expressed its deepest desire to remain on friendly terms with Pakistan and stated that it understood that Jinnah, who was anxious for a correct decision, wanted more time to study the issues between Kalat and Pakistan. Mountbatten, however, suggested that Jinnah not be brought into the discussions.

Mountbatten insisted that Kalat and Pakistan sign a standstill agreement, which both countries did. The Standstill Agreement also stipulated that both parties would discuss as soon as possible about their relationship concerning Defence and External Affairs. According to the Article I, 'The Government of Pakistan agrees that Kalat is an independent State, being quite different in status from other States of India'. However, the Article IV stated:

Through this agreement, the British Paramountcy was effectively transferred to Pakistan.

However, without making any agreement with Pakistan and in violation of the Standstill Agreement the Khan of Kalat declared independence. Later on, the ruler of Kalat unconditionally signed an Instrument of Accession with Pakistan on 27 March 1948, contrary to the wishes of his state's legislature, being the last of all princely states to do so.

First conflict
Balochistan contained a Chief Commissioner's province and four princely states under the British Raj. The province's Shahi Jirga and the non-official members of the Quetta Municipality opted for Pakistan unanimously on 29 June 1947. Three of the princely states, Makran, Las Bela and Kharan, acceded to Pakistan in 1947 after independence. But the ruler of the fourth princely state, the Khan of Kalat, Ahmad Yar Khan, who used to call Jinnah his 'father', declared Kalat's independence as this was one of the options given to all of the 535 princely states by British Prime Minister Clement Attlee.

Kalat finally acceded to Pakistan on 27 March 1948 after the 'strange help' of All India Radio and a period of negotiations and bureaucratic tactics used by Pakistan. The signing of the Instrument of Accession by Ahmad Yar Khan, led his brother, Prince Abdul Karim, to revolt against his brother's decision in July 1948. Princes Agha Abdul Karim Baloch and Muhammad Rahim, refused to lay down arms, leading the Dosht-e Jhalawan in unconventional attacks on the army until 1950. The Princes fought a lone battle without support from the rest of Balochistan. Jinnah and his successors allowed Yar Khan to retain his title until the province's dissolution in 1955.

Second conflict
Nawab Nauroz Khan took up arms in resistance to the One Unit policy, which decreased government representation for tribal leaders, from 1958 to 1959. He and his followers started a guerrilla war against Pakistan, and were arrested, charged with treason, and imprisoned in Hyderabad. Five of his family members, sons and nephews, were subsequently hanged on charges of treason and aiding in the murder of Pakistani troops. Nawab Nauroz Khan later died in captivity. Nawab Nauroz Khan fought a lone battle as the rest of Balochistan did not support the uprising.

Third conflict
After the second conflict, a Baloch separatist movement gained momentum in the 1960s, following the introduction of a new constitution in 1956 which limited provincial autonomy and enacted the 'One Unit' concept of political organisation in Pakistan. Tension continued to grow amid consistent political disorder and instability at the federal level. The federal government tasked the Pakistan Army with building several new bases in key areas of Balochistan. Sher Muhammad Bijrani Marri led like-minded militants into guerrilla warfare from 1963 to 1969 by creating their own insurgent bases. Their goal was to force Pakistan to share revenue generated from the Sui gas fields with the tribal leaders. The insurgents bombed railway tracks and ambushed convoys. The Army retaliated by destroying the militant camps. This insurgency ended in 1969, with the Baloch separatists agreeing to a ceasefire. In 1970 Pakistani President Yahya Khan abolished the "One Unit" policy, which led to the recognition of Balochistan as the fourth province of West Pakistan (present-day Pakistan), including all the Balochistani princely states, the High Commissioners Province, and Gwadar, an 800 km2 coastal area purchased from Oman by the Pakistani government.

Fourth conflict, 1973–1977

The unrest continued into the 1970s, culminating in a government-ordered military operation in the region in 1973.

In 1973, citing treason, President Bhutto dismissed the provincial governments of Balochistan and NWFP and imposed martial law in those areas, which led to armed insurgency. Khair Bakhsh Marri formed the Balochistan People's Liberation Front (BPLF), which led large numbers of Marri and Mengal tribesmen into guerrilla warfare against the central government.

Assisted by Iran, Pakistani forces inflicted heavy casualties on the separatists. The insurgency fell into decline after a return to the four-province structure and the abolishment of the Sardari system.

Fifth conflict, 2004–present

In early 2005, the rape of a female doctor (Shazia Khalid) at the Sui gas facility re-ignited another long running conflict. Her case and the unusual comment by then Pakistani President Pervez Musharraf about the controversy, stating on national television that the accused rapist, an officer identified only as Captain Hammad, was "not guilty", led to a violent uprising by the Bugti tribe, disrupting the supply of gas to much of the country for several weeks. In 2005, the Baluch political leaders Nawab Akbar Khan Bugti and Mir Balach Marri presented a 15-point agenda to the Pakistan government. Their stated demands included greater control of the province's resources and a moratorium on the construction of military bases. On 15 December 2005 the inspector general of the Frontier Corps, Major General Shujaat Zamir Dar, and his deputy Brigadier Salim Nawaz (the current IGFC) were wounded after shots were fired at their helicopter in Balochistan Province. The provincial interior secretary later said that, after visiting Kohlu, "both of them were wounded in the leg but both are in stable condition."

However, a 2006 cable from the Embassy of the United States, Islamabad leaked by WikiLeaks noted that,“There seems to be little support in the province, beyond the Bugti tribe, for the current insurgency.”

In August 2006, Nawab Akbar Khan Bugti, 79 years old, was killed in fighting against the Pakistan Army, in which at least 60 Pakistani soldiers and 7 officers were also killed. Pakistan's government had charged him with responsibility for a series of deadly bomb blasts and a rocket attack on President Pervez Musharraf.

In April 2009, Baloch National Movement president Ghulam Mohammed Baloch and two other nationalist leaders (Lala Munir and Sher Muhammad) were seized from a small legal office and were allegedly "handcuffed, blindfolded and hustled into a waiting pickup truck which is in still [sic] use of intelligence forces in front of their lawyer and neighboring shopkeepers." The gunmen were allegedly speaking in Persian (a national language of neighbouring Afghanistan and Iran). Five days later, on 8 April, their bullet-riddled bodies were found in a commercial area. The BLA claimed Pakistani forces were behind the killings, though international experts have deemed it odd that the Pakistani forces would be careless enough to allow the bodies to be found so easily and "light Balochistan on fire" (Herald) if they were truly responsible. The discovery of the bodies sparked rioting and weeks of strikes, demonstrations, and civil resistance in cities and towns around Balochistan.

On 12 August 2009, Khan of Kalat Mir Suleiman Dawood declared himself ruler of Balochistan and formally announced a Council for Independent Balochistan. The council's claimed domain includes Sistan and Baluchestan Province, as well as Pakistani Balochistan, but does not include Afghan Baloch regions. The council claimed the allegiance of "all separatist leaders including Nawabzada Bramdagh Bugti." Suleiman Dawood stated that the UK had a "moral responsibility to raise the issue of Balochistan's illegal occupation at international level."

The Economist wrote: 

In the aftermath of Akbar Bugti's killing, support for the insurgency surged with a large amount of support coming from Balochistan's burgeoning middle class. US-based exiled Baloch journalist and newspaper editor Malik Siraj Akbar writes that the ongoing Baloch resistance has created "serious challenges" for the Pakistan government, "unlike the past resistance movements", because it has lasted longer than previous insurgencies, has greater breadth—including the entire province "from rural mountainous regions to the city centers", involves Baloch women and children at "regular protest rallies", and has drawn more international attention—including a 2012 hearing by the US Congress. Islamabad has accused its neighbour India of supporting the insurgency in Balochistan. However infighting between insurgent groups as of late 2014 has weakened the movement. On 23 November  Chinese Consulate was attacked by BLA fighters.

As of 2018, the Pakistani state was using Islamist militants to defeat Balochi separatists. Academics and journalists in the United States have been approached by Pakistani Inter-Services Intelligence spies, who threatened them not to speak about the insurgency in Balochistan, as well as human rights abuses by the Pakistani Army or else their family would be harmed.

On 16 February 2019, armed men killed two Frontier Corps in Loralai. On 17 February 2019, another attack took place on Pakistani security personnel in which four members of the Frontier Corps were killed in the Gardab area of Panjgur District.

On 15 October 2020, at least 14 security personnel were killed in the first incident after a convoy of state-run Oil & Gas Development Company (OGDCL) was attacked on the coastal highway in Balochistan's Ormara, Radio Pakistan reported.

On 27 December 2020, seven soldiers were killed in a gun attack on a Frontier Corps (FC) Balochistan post in Harnai district.

Through 2020, Pakistan recorded 506 fatalities (69 civilians, 178 SF personnel, and 159 militants), of which Balochistan alone accounted for 215 fatalities (84 civilians, 94 SF personnel, and 37 militants). The Province was a close second only to Khyber Pakhtunkhwa, which recorded 216 fatalities (61 civilians, 57 SF personnel, and 98 militants).  

According to the PIPS report, Balochistan is the second most affected province by Pakistan in 2021. The report said that 136 people were killed in 81 terrorist attacks in Balochistan last year, which were carried out by religious militants and Baloch nationalist organizations.

Of the 81 terrorist attacks in the province in 2021, 71 were carried out by banned nationalist organizations such as the Baloch Liberation Army, Balochistan Liberation Front, Baloch Republican Army and Baloch Republican Guards. According to the PIPS report, 95 people were killed in attacks by nationalist organizations. In addition, 14 people were killed in five terrorist incidents in Punjab and 13 in six terrorist incidents in Sindh.

On 18 January 2022, at least five people were injured on Tuesday when an improvised explosive device (IED) planted near a railway track in the Mashkaf area of Balochistan's Bolan district.

On 20 January 2022, at least three people were killed and over 20 others injured by a bombing in Anarkali Bazaar, Lahore. Spokesperson of the Baloch Nationalist Army, claimed responsibility for this attack and said that it targeted bank employees.

On 25 January 2022, militants stormed a check post belonging to Pakistani military in the Sabdan area of Dasht, Kech District in Balochistan killing at least 10 security personnel and injuring 3 others. The clash lasted for five hours in which militants also suffered several casualties. The militants also seized weapons that were present in the check post.

On 28 January 2022, at least four people were killed and 10 others were injured in a blast in Mat area of Sui in Balochistan's Dera Bugti district. Balochistan Awami Party (BAP) leader Sarfraz Bugti claimed that "Baloch Republican Army terrorists" were behind the attack.

On 30 January 2022, 17 people, including two policemen, were injured in a grenade attack in Dera Allahyar town of Jaffarabad district.

In January 2022, militants carried out six attacks in which 17 people were killed, most of whom were security forces (14 security forces; 3 civilians), and 32 people were injured, most of whom were civilians (26 civilians; 6 security forces).

On 2 February 2022, 9 militants and 12 soldiers were killed at Panjgur and Nushki districts of Pakistan's Balochistan province after forces responded to their attack. The Balochistan Liberation Army, claimed to have killed more than 100 soldiers at two military camps, claims rejected by Pakistan government.

On 4 February 2022, at Chaman, a town bordering Afghanistan at least six people were injured in a grenade attack at para-military post.

On 8 February 2022, a blast in Balochistan's Dera Murad Jamali town has killed one person and injured another two. A man identified as Dildar Ali was killed and two were injured.

On 2 March 2022, a massive explosion took place at Fatima Jinnah Road in Quetta killing three people including a Deputy Superintendent of Police (DSP) and wounding 25 others including two police personnel.

On 8 March 2022, at least seven security personnel were killed in an explosion in Sibi, several minutes after President Arif Alvi addressed a colourful concluding ceremony of the Sibi Mela at a venue.

on 15 March 2022, at least four soldiers of the Frontier Corps (FC) were killed and six were seriously injured when an improvised explosive device (IED) exploded near a security forces' convoy in the area of Sangan in Sibi, Balochistan.

Conflict in Iran

In 2014 there were about two million ethnic Baloch in Iran.

In 1928, the new Pahlavī government of Iran was sufficiently well established to turn its attention to Baluchistan. Dost Mohammad Khan Baloch refused to submit, trusting in the network of alliances he had built up over the whole of the province south of the Sarḥadd. However, as soon as Reżā Shah's army under General Amīr Amanullah Jahanbani arrived in the area, the alliances dissolved. Dūst-Moḥammad Khan was left with a relatively small force and few allies of any consequence. The Persian army had little difficulty in defeating him. Once again Baluch political unity proved highly brittle. Dūst-Moḥammad eventually surrendered and was pardoned on condition he live in Tehran. After a year, he escaped while on a hunting trip. In due course, he was recaptured, and having killed his guard in the escape was hanged for murder. Baloch activists complained that the new governance was centralised and dominated by the Persians, "forcing the Baloch community and other minorities to fight to protect their rights."

Baloch people in Iran have several grievances. The Shi'ite Islamic revolution perceived the predominantly Sunni Baloch as a "threat". Sistan-e-Balochistan, the province where Baloch have traditionally lived in Iran, has the country's worst rates for life expectancy, adult literacy, primary school enrolment, access to improved water sources and sanitation, infant mortality rate, of any province in Iran. Despite its important natural resources (gas, gold, copper, oil and uranium), the province has the lowest per capita income in Iran. Almost 80% of the Baloch live under the poverty line.

Attacks by insurgents
In the early 2000s the radical Islamist group Jundallah became active in Balochistan. The al Qaeda-linked extremist organisation has branches in both Iran and Pakistan. From 2003 to 2012, an estimated 296 people were killed in Jundullah-related violence in Iran. Attacks in Iran included bombings in Zahedan in 2007, which killed 18 people, and another bombing in 2009 that killed 20 people. In 2009, 43 people were killed in a bombing in Pishin.
In July 2010, 27 people were killed in bombings in Zahedan. In 2010, a suicide bombing in Chabahar killed 38 people.

Among the deaths in the Pishin bombings were two Iranian Revolutionary Guards generals: Noor Ali Shooshtari, the deputy commander of the Revolutionary Guards' ground forces, and Rajab Ali Mhammadzadeh, the Revolutionary Guards' Sistan and Baluchistan provincial commander.

In 2010 the leader of Jundallah, Abdolmalek Rigi, was killed, causing fragmentation of the group but not an end to insurgent attacks. In October 2013, the group Jaish al-Adl (JAA, Army of Justice), killed 14 Iranian border guards in an ambush in the town of Rustak, near the town of Saravan. Shortly thereafter, the Iranian authorities executed 16 Balochs, on charges ranging from terrorism to drug trafficking. Another group, Harakat Ansar Iran (Partisan Movement of Iran, HAI) killed two Basij officers and wounded numerous civilians in an October 2012 suicide bombing against the mosque of Imam Hussein, in the port city of Chabahar (Sistan and Baluchestan Province).

According to analyst Daniele Grassi, "Salafism plays an increasingly central role" for the "post-Jundallah" militants of JAA and HAI. "The rhetoric of groups such as HAI and JAA uses strongly anti-Shia tones. The two groups often refer to the Iranian Islamic Republic as a Safavid regime, in reference to the Safavid dynasty which introduced Shiism in Iran." Iran is also concerned about anti-Shia co-operation between the two groups and ISIS.

Iran has accused America of supporting Jundallah "for years". The US government, which has officially designated Jundallah a terrorist organisation, has denied this charge. Iran has been angered by JAA's use of Pakistani territory as a refuge, and has threatened military operations in Pakistan to counter insurgent groups "on several occasions".

Drivers of insurgency
In Balochistan, Pakistan, "drivers" of insurgency have been economic, cultural, involving immigration and human rights.

The immediate reasons for joining one of the several separatist militant groups vary among militants with citing the allure of power and excitement, a desire to honor their centuries-old tribal codes, gaining recognition for their region’s distinct ethnicity and even a belief in hard-line communism. Another cited reason by some is employment and funding to work as mercenaries for foreign state agencies.

Economic inequality 
Economic inequality, and Balochistan's status as a "neglected province where a majority of population lacks amenities" is a dimension in the conflict. Since the mid-1970s Balochistan's share of Pakistan's GDP has dropped from 4.9 to 3.7%. Balochistan has the highest infant and maternal mortality rate, the highest poverty rate, and the lowest literacy rate in Pakistan.

On the other hand, according to a report published in the Pakistani English-language Dawn newspaper, members of Balochistan's elite society, including provincial government ministers and officials, own "pieces of land greater in size than some small towns of the country", and had luxury vehicles, properties, investments and businesses valued at millions of rupees.

Development issues

Gas revenue
Balochistan receives less per/unit in royalties than Sindh and Punjab provinces, since Balochistan's wellhead price five times lower than in Sindh and Punjab (the gas wellhead price is based on per capita provincial income in 1953). Furthermore, the government has returned little of the royalties owed to the province, citing the need to recover operating costs. Consequently, Balochistan is heavily in debt.

Balochistan Province receives Rs 32.71 per unit on gas revenues, including a royalty of Rs 13.90, excise duty of Rs 5.09, and gas development surcharge of Rs 13.72. Many private individuals with gas deposits on their land also receive payments. Many Balochs argue that such royalties are too low. In response, in 2011 Prime Minister Syed Yusuf Raza Gilani announced an addition of Rs. 120 billion (US$2.5 billion) to the gas development surcharge and royalty portion of the "Aghaz-e-Haqooq-e-Balochistan" package. However, royalties often do not trickle down to the common people in Balochistan due to the corruption and wealth-hoarding of Baloch tribal chiefs. This has hindered the growth of infrastructure.

Regional inequality
Extensive road and rail links developed by British colonialists in northern parts of Balochistan province have brought greater economic development to areas mainly inhabited by ethnic Pashtuns, which has also heightened nationalism among ethnic Balochs living in the southern parts of the within the province.

Gwadar
Purchased by the government of Pakistan from Oman in 1958, the construction of the megaport of Gwadar beginning in 2002 became another source of grievances. Baloch complain that construction of the port relies on Chinese engineers and labourers, and few Balochs have been employed. A parallel town for workers at Gwadar is being built close to the old one to segregate Balochs from the growing influx of outsiders.

The Pakistani government has stationed soldiers in the area to secure it from insurgent attacks.

Multiculturalism and immigration
Due to the historical shortage of skilled labour in Balochistan, skilled workers are often imported from other regions. Their arrival means new industries can develop, boosting the local economy; however, nationalists argue that this creates resentment amongst the local inhabitants.

After the Soviet invasion, around 4 million refugees from Afghanistan arrived and settled in the region which has resulted in substantial demographic imbalance. Perceived marginalisation as a result of increased Pashtun migration from Afghanistan during the Afghan War drives the insurgency.

Education issues
A major factor in the Balouchistan conflict is education, which nationalists feel has been neglected. The government of Pakistan recognises that importing skilled labour from other regions has caused tensions in the region, and has thus sought to encourage scholarships for Balochi students so they can participate in development programmes. The quota for Baloch students in Punjab university was doubled in 2010 under the Cheema Long Scheme, on the order of CM Shabaz Sharif. The provincial governments of Sindh, Punjab and KP said they would take steps to encourage Balochistan students to enroll and benefit from 100% scholarships.

Military response
Many Balochis have not tended to look favourably on Pakistan and the army's intervention in politics as they see the military as dominated by Punjabis and the interests of the Punjabis (who make up 45% of Pakistan's population) and lacking Baloch representation.

In the insurgencies themselves, the military's "harsh response" has led to "a spiral of violence". (See Human Rights Issues below.) A report by the Pakistan Security Research Unit notes, "Islamabad's militarized approach has led to ... violence, widespread human rights abuses, mass internal displacement and the deaths of hundreds of civilians and armed personnel."

According to the International Crisis Group the attempt to crush the insurgency as in earlier insurgencies is feeding Baloch disaffection.
Moderate Balochs have been alienated from the government by the imprisonment of civilians without charges, and routine kidnapping of dissidents.

Foreign support

Afghanistan

Afghanistan has provided sanctuary and training to Baloch separatists in 1948, in the mid-1950s, and more vigorously under the regime of Afghan President Mohammed Daoud Khan. In the 1970s, Daoud Khan's government established training camps in Afghanistan, at Kabul and Kandahar, for Baloch rebels. These were the first modern training camps in the country. The camps in Kabul were under the supervision and control of Republican guards.

The former Pakistani ambassador to the US, Hussain Haqqani, wrote that in the 1970s training camps were set up in Afghanistan by Daoud to support Baloch separatists in Pakistan. According to a student paper, "Pakistan's fear that a communist Afghanistan would embolden the Baloch and Pashtun Marxist separatists in the western Pakistani province of Balochistan was confirmed when Daoud began supporting Marxist Baloch and Pashtun groups in eastern Afghanistan".

Daoud Khan ended hostilities against Pakistan following a 1975 Panjshir uprising led by Ahmad Shah Massoud against Khan's government. Visiting Pakistan in 1976, and again in 1978, Daoud Khan expressed his desire for peace between the two countries. In 1978, however, he was removed from office by a communist coup in Afghanistan, after which Nur Muhammad Taraki seized power and established the Democratic Republic of Afghanistan. Nur Muhammad Taraki reopened the Baloch training camps in Afghanistan and once again started offering arms and aid to Baloch rebels.

According to WikiLeaks cables published in 2010, the then-president of Afghanistan, Hamid Karzai, had been providing shelter to Brahumdagh Bugti for several years. Brahumdagh Bugti, along with some 20 separatists, had fled to Afghanistan in 2006, and his presence in Afghanistan had created tensions between Pakistan and Afghanistan. In 2007 Pakistan's president, Pervaiz Musharraf, stated that Bugti was freely traveling between Kabul and Kandahar, raising money and planning attacks against Pakistani security forces. Musharraf repeatedly asked Hamid Karzai to hand over Bugti, which Karzai refused to do. In public, Afghan officials denied providing shelter to Bugti, but later, following a 2009 meeting between UN officials and Karzai, admitted that Bugti was indeed living in Kabul. While speaking to The Guardian, Bugti admitted that he was leading the fight against Pakistan's army. In 2010 he travelled to Switzerland and took up residence there. In 2017, his request for political asylum was rejected by Swiss authorities on the grounds that he had been linked to "incidents of terrorism, violence and militant activities".

The Chief of Frontier Corps troops in Balochistan, Major General Obaidullah Khan Khattak, said in June 2012 that "over 30 militant camps" had been established in Afghanistan. The camps receive support from Afghanistan and are used "to launch terrorist and anti-state activities in Balochistan". Malik Siraj Akbar, a Washington-based analyst, states that Afghanistan has always been a relatively safe hideout for the Baloch nationalist militants.

On 25 December 2018, Aslam Baloch, alias Achu, and six other Baloch Liberation Army (BLA) commanders were killed in a suicide attack in Kandahar, Afghanistan. A BLA spokesman confirmed their deaths. Afghan officials stated that General Abdul Raziq Achakzai had housed Aslam Baloch and other separatist in Kandahar for years. Moreover, the Afghan news channel TOLOnews reported that Aslam Baloch had been residing in Afghanistan since 2005. According to Kandahar police chief Tadin Khan Achakzai, Aslam Baloch and Abdul Raziq Achakzai were 'close friends' and that 'Afghans will continue supporting separatist groups in their fight against the government of Pakistan'.

On 23 May 2019, a similar attack took place in Aino Mina, Kandahar. Laghari Bugti and three other Baloch insurgents were killed, while a further twelve were injured. Afghan provincial council member Yousaf Younasi .  said it was the second attack on Baloch Liberation Army members in recent years in Kandahar's posh Aino Mina residential area, and that Aslam Baloch, alias Achu, had been killed in the same area. Baloch separatist leader Sher Muhammad Bugti confirmed that the attack had taken place, but said that target of the attack was a senior separatist leader, Shah Wali Bugti. He said that 'Baloch separatist are not safe in Kandahar and they have come under attack in three places over the past few months'. Kandahar Police Chief Tadin Khan stated that the attack in Aino Mena took place outside the house of a former National Directorate of Security (NDS) official.

India
Avinash Paliwal claims that in the 1970s, Junior level Indian intelligence officers were actively involved in operations in Balochistan. In a book he authored, Paliwal says these officers claim that "we gave Baloch everything, from money to guns, during the 1970s, everything". He further states that, like Pakistan and India, Iraq and Iran were bitter rivals. As a result, Pakistan and Iran had developed closer relations with each other, while India and Iraq did likewise. Arming Baloch insurgents in Iran and Pakistan was in the interest of both Iraq and India. Militant groups like Pasthun Zalmay, which were made up of Baloch and Pashtun militants, were in direct contact with Kabul as well as with Indian and Iraqi missions in Afghanistan. Pashtun Zalmay was responsible for a series of bomb blasts and other insurgent activities in Pakistan. As a consequence, relations between Iran and India deteriorated so much that in 1975, Indian diplomat Ram D. Sathe sent a secret letter to
the Indian ambassador in Tehran in which he claimed that "it will be [only] a few more days before Iranians will stridently back Pakistanis (on Kashmir) ... Personally I do not think we should be under any illusion about this matter. I think Iranians will definitely back the Pakistanis".

Later on, in 2008, Paliwal claimed that if there had ever been an India-Afghanistan axis on Balochistan, it would likely have been in full play during this period. Afghan intelligence chief Amarullah Saleh and Indian diplomat Mayankote Kelath Narayanan were closely engaged with Baloch militants. Paliwal claims that even if Indian intelligence agencies denied direct support to Baloch insurgents, it was unlikely that they would have remained aloof from unfolding dynamics. Atul Khare, who observed these events on a regular basis, confirmed that India had contacts with Baloch militants. India had given (limited) protection to sons and grandsons of Baloch leaders, as well as Akbar Bugti. However, Khare claims that India did not help Akbar Bugti when he was killed during the fight with the Pakistan Army. In January 2009, Baloch militants continued their attacks against Pakistan. Both Pakistan and the United Kingdom believed that India was providing support to the Baloch militants.

The Indian newspaper The Hindu reported that Balochistan Liberation Army (BLA) commanders had, in the past, sought medical treatment in India's hospitals, often in disguise or with fake identities. In one such case, a militant commander in charge of Khuzdar city was based in Delhi for at least six months in 2017 while he underwent extensive treatment for kidney-related ailments. Baloch militants' visits to India were often under assumed identities. Similarly, another Baloch Liberation Army commander, Aslam Baloch (alias Achu), was also alleged to have visited India, where he met with people who were sympathetic to the Balochi cause. Aslam Baloch was also alleged to have been treated at a hospital in New Delhi. Jitendranand Saraswati, the founder of the Hind Baloch forum, claimed that Indians were actively contributing to the "freedom struggle of Balochistan".

According to Malik Siraj Akbar, a Baloch journalist living in exile, there is a consensus among Pakistani authorities that India is behind the insurgency in Balochistan, without feeling a need to share evidence of Indian involvement. Pakistan has repeatedly accused India of supporting Baloch rebels, starting with an attack in Gwadar in 2004 in which three Chinese engineers were killed. Wright-Neville writes that the Pakistani government and some Western observers believe that India secretly funds the Balochistan Liberation Army (BLA).

The former American Af-Pak envoy Richard Holbrooke said in 2011 that while Pakistan had repeatedly shared its allegations with Washington, it had failed to provide any evidence to the United States that India was involved with separatist movements in Balochistan. He did not consider Pakistan's accusations against India credible. Holbrooke also strongly rejected the allegation that India was using its consulates in Afghanistan to facilitate Baloch rebel activity, saying he had "no reason to believe Islamabad's charges", and that "Pakistan would do well to examine its own internal problems". In 2009, a Washington-based think tank, the Center for International Policy, published a report stating that no evidence of Indian involvement in Balochistan had been provided by Pakistan, and that the allegations made by Pakistan lacked credibility, as Baloch rebels had been fighting with "ineffectual small arms".

India has categorically denied the allegations, pointing to Pakistan's failure to provide evidence.

Brahamdagh Bugti stated in a 2008 interview that he would accept aid from India, Afghanistan, and Iran in defending Balochistan. When asked about the alleged links between his group and India, he is reported to have laughed and said, "Would our people live amid such miserable conditions if we enjoyed support from India?" Baloch National Front secretary Karima Baloch claims that the allegations against India are an "excuse to label [the] ingrown Balochistan freedom movement as a proxy war to cover up the war crimes [the] Pakistani state has committed in Balochistan".

On 29 March 2016, the Pakistani government announced that it had apprehended a serving Indian naval officer, Kulbhushan Yadav, who, in a video interview, admitted that he had been tasked by the Research and Analysis Wing (R&AW) with destabilizing Pakistan. The Indian government confirmed that Yadav was a former naval officer but denied that "this individual was involved in subversive activities in Pakistan at our [the Indian government's] behest", and asserted that he operated "a legitimate business in Iran", from where he may have been "abducted" by Pakistan or, alternatively, by the extremist militant organization Jaishul Adil.

In 2016, Indian Prime Minister Narendra Modi criticized Pakistan and alleged human rights issues in Balochistan during an Independence Day speech. Pakistan condemned Modi's remarks, calling it an attempted diversion from violence in Kashmir and a reiteration of Pakistani allegations vis-a-vis Indian involvement in Balochistan. Modi's comments were welcomed by exiled Baloch separatist leaders but sparked anti-India protests by political organizations and locals in Balochistan.

On 8 October 2015, the Indian newspaper The Hindu confirmed the presence of Balaach Pardili, a representative of the Balochistan Liberation Organisation (BLO), in India. Balaach Pardili hails from Afghanistan and has been living in Delhi since 2009. Hyrbyair Marri, leader of the Baloch Liberation Army (BLA), had assigned Pardili the task of representing him in public events in India. Mr. Pardili appeared in public on 4 October 2015, under the banner of Bhagat Singh Kranti Sena (BSKS). His presence in India angered Pakistan. A Pakistani diplomat stated that in response to Pardili's presence in India, Pakistan could take up the issue in India's troubled North-Eastern region.

Naela Quadri Baloch and her son Mazdak Dilshad Baloch also live in India. Mazdak Dilshad Baloch organizes campaigns in India to support the Baloch cause, while his mother, Naela Quadri Baloch, is trying to gain support for the establishment of a Baloch Government-in-exile in India. However, Naela Quadri Baloch's proposal for a Government-in-exile has been strongly opposed by other Baloch separatist leaders, such as Brahamdagh Bugti, who claim that Naela Quadri does not represent the Baloch people.

On 7 May 2020, a retired Indian Army Major speaking on live television threatened to harm Pakistani soldiers in Balochistan.

Iraq
On 10 February 1973, Pakistani police and paramilitary raided the Iraqi embassy in Islamabad, seizing a large cache of small arms, ammunition, grenades and other supplies, which were found in crates marked 'Foreign Ministry, Baghdad'. The ammunition and weaponry was believed to be destined for Baloch rebels. Pakistan responded by expelling and declaring persona non grata the Iraqi Ambassador Hikmat Sulaiman and other consular staff. In a letter to U.S. President Nixon on 14 February, Bhutto blamed India and Afghanistan, along with Iraq and the Soviet Union, for involvement in a "conspiracy ... [with] subversive and irredentist elements which seek to disrupt Pakistan's integrity."

Israel
According to author Mark Perry, CIA memos revealed that in 2007 and 2008 Israeli agents posed as American spies and recruited Pakistani citizens to work for Jundallah (BLA affiliate) and carried out false flag operations against Iran.

The Baloch Society of North America (BSO-NA) was a Baloch lobbying group founded in 2004 in Washington, D.C. by Dr. Wahid Baloch, a graduate of Bolan Medical College who had gone into self-imposed exile in the United States in 1992. Between 2004 and 2014, his group had been trying to gain American (as well as Israeli) support for the independence of Balochistan. He held meetings with several American Congressmen and allegedly had meetings with several CIA officials. Dr. Baloch had long claimed that the Pakistani government was committing acts of genocide against the Baloch people, and that Islamabad's aim was to plunder the province's vast mineral resources. In January 2014 he released a letter appealing to the United States and Israel for direct assistance in preventing an alleged "killing spree of Baloch people" by the "Pakistani army".

In May 2014, Dr. Baloch disbanded the BSO-NA, claiming that the War of Independence of Balochistan was actually a "war of independence of Khans, Nawabs and Sardars". He has since formed the Baloch Council of North America (BCN), which has dedicated itself to working with all democratic and nationalist forces in Pakistan to secure Baloch rights through democratic, nonviolent means, within the federation of Pakistan.

Soviet Union
Pakistani scholar Syed F. Hasnat alleged that during the Soviet–Afghan War (1979–1989), the Soviet Union helped establish the Balochistan Liberation Army which chiefly operates from southern Afghanistan.

United States
The US State Department's official policy rejects secessionist forces in the Pakistani part of Balochistan, in support of the country's "unity and territorial integrity". The US has, however, expressed concerns over human rights issues and urged parties in Pakistan to "work out their differences peaceably and through a valid political process." In February 2010 a Jundullah leader captured by Iran, Abdulmalek Rigi, alleged on Iranian TV "that the US had promised to provide" Jundullah "with military equipment and a base in Afghanistan, near the Iranian border" for its fight against Iran. Rigi did not mention assistance in fighting Pakistan (which Iran accuses of backing the Jundullah, according to the BBC). The US has denied links with Jundullah, and according to the BBC, "it is not possible" to determine whether Abdolmalek Rigi "made the statement freely or under duress."

In late 2011, the Balochistan conflict became the focus of dialogue on a new US South Asia strategy brought up by some US congressmen, who said they were frustrated over Pakistan's alleged continued support to the Afghan Taliban, which they said led to the continuation of the War in Afghanistan. Although this alternative to the Obama Administration's Af-Pak policy has generated some interest, "its advocates clearly do not yet have broad support".

In the 1980s the CIA, the Iraqi Intelligence Service, Pakistani Sunni extremist group Sipah-e-Sahaba Pakistan, and the Mujahedin e-Kalq supported a Baluchi tribal uprising against Iran. A February 2011 article by Selig S. Harrison of the Center for International Policy called for supporting "anti-Islamist forces" along the southern Arabian Sea coast, including "Baluch insurgents fighting for independence from Pakistan", as a means of weakening the "rising tide of anti-American passion" in Pakistan and heading off any alliance between Islamabad and Beijing – Pakistan having granted China access to a naval base at Gwadar.

United States of America has also designated Balochistan Liberation Army (BLA) as a global terrorist organization on 2 July 2019.

Decline in insurgency

The separatist insurgency peaked after the death of nationalist leader Akbar Bugti in 2006. However, since 2013, the strength and intensity of insurgency has gradually declined. 2013 Elections resulted in the formation of coalition among Baloch and Pashtun ethno-nationalist political parties and they ruled the province for the next four years. The decline of Marxist ideology is also one of the factors which limit the scope of the nationalist insurgency. The separatist groups follow Marxism. However, the ideology itself has died across the world. Hence, the founding fathers of the Baloch revolution are dead and there are no ideologies to succeed them. Similarly, disagreement which most of the time lead to clashes among the separatist groups and attacks on pro-government leaders and politicians who are willing to take part in election has also contributed to the decline in separatist appeal. Another factor which limits the scope of nationalist insurgency is the infighting among the separatist groups. Separatists have also been fighting among themselves. On 30 June 2015, Baloch Liberation Army (BLA) clashed with United Baloch Army (UBA), which resulted in death of twenty separatist on both sides. Previously, BLA had attacked and captured one of the commander of UBA and killed four other members of UBA.

Moreover, the separatists have been losing ranks. Though the exact strength of Baloch Liberation Army (BLA) is not known, analyst believe that BLA now only has several hundred fighters based out of Afghanistan Balochistan borderland. The group is the only one to survive out of other separatist groups (UBA, BLF, BLUF and LeB) who once operated in the region.

Furthermore, Baloch separatist themselves stand accused of rights abuses. Human Rights Watch (HRW) published a 40-page report which criticised Baloch nationalists of killing, threatening and harassing teachers. Human Right Watch (HRW) has also held separatist responsible for attacks on schools across the province. Another factor which limits the scope of nationalist insurgency is the lack of support from locals as majority of locals don't support separatist groups. Locals support political parties who use legislature to address their grievances.

Human rights issues

Human Right Organisations have held Balochistan Liberation Army (BLA) responsible for ethnic cleansing in the province as Brahamdagh Bugti (alleged leader of BLA), during a TV interview on 15 April 2009, urged separatists to kill non-Baloch residing in Balochistan. His actions allegedly lead to the death of 500 non-Baloch citizens in the province. According to The Economist around 800 non-Baloch settlers and Baloch have been killed by Baloch militant groups since 2006. Similarly, Human Right Watch have also held Baloch militants groups like Baloch liberation army (BLA) and Balochistan Liberation United Front (BLUF) to be responsible for attacks on schools, teachers and students in the province. As a result, many teachers have sought transfer to secure areas such as Quetta or have moved out of province entirely. Separatist militants groups have also claimed responsibility for attacking and killing Journalists in the province. Apart from Human Right Organisations, Baloch separatists themselves have accused each other of being involved in Human right violations.

In the period 2003 to 2012, it is estimated that 8000 people were abducted by Pakistani security forces in Balochistan. In 2008 alone, more than 1100 Baloch people disappeared. There have also been reports of torture. An increasing number of bodies "with burn marks, broken limbs, nails pulled out, and sometimes with holes drilled in their heads" are being found on roadsides as the result of a "kill and dump" campaign allegedly conducted by Pakistani security forces, particularly Inter-Services Intelligence (ISI) and the Frontier Corps (FC). A 2013 report from the Human Rights Commission of Pakistan identified ISI and Frontier Corps as the perpetrators for many disappearances, while noting a more cooperative stance from these agencies in recent years as perceived by local police forces. The Pakistan Rangers are also alleged to have committed a vast number of human rights violations in the region. No one has been held responsible for the crimes. However, Pakistani security officials have rejected all the allegations made against them. Major General Obaid Ullah Khan claim that Baloch militants are using Frontier Corps (FC) uniform to kidnap people and malign the good name of Frontier Corps. Baloch militants have also been found using military uniform which resembles the one used by Frontier Corps while carrying out their activities. A senior Pakistani provincial security official claims that missing person figures are 'exaggerated', that 'in Balochistan, insurgents, immigrants who fled to Europe and even those who have been killed in military operations are declared as missing persons'. Reports have shown that many people have fled the province to seek asylum in other countries because of the unrest caused by separatist militants.

Militant groups like Lashkar-e-Jhangvi have systematically targeted Shia Muslims in Balochistan, with about 600 being killed in attacks in recent years.

During a camp at Broken Chair, Geneva, Baloch Republican Party (BRP) leader Sher Baz Bugti alleged that Baloch youth, women and children were kept in "torture cells". BRP chief Brahumdagh Bugti called upon human rights organisation, including the United Nations, to take steps to stop the alleged "Baloch genocide".

Sunni extremism and religious persecution of Zikris
The activities of terrorist organisations such as Lashkar-i-Jhangvi and Tehrik-i-Taliban Pakistan, have produced a surge in religious extremism in Balochistan. Hindus, Shias (including Hazaras) and Zikris have been targeted, resulting in the migration of over 300,000 of them from Baluchistan.

Baloch Liberation Front (BLF) and Baloch Liberation Army (BLA) have also targeted Zikris in the province.

Supreme Court investigation
There are more than 5,000 cases of 'forced disappearances' in Balochistan. Many are innocent and stuck in Pakistan's slow court system whilst others are in prison awaiting charges on a range of things such as gun smuggling and robbery. The chief justice of an apex court of Pakistan asked about the situation and said it was going out of control in Balochistan. The Supreme Court is currently investigating the "missing persons" and issued an arrest warrant for the former Military Dictator Pervez Musharaff. Furthermore, the Chief Justice of the court said the military must act under the government's direction and follow well-defined parameters set by the Constitution.

Missing people found
In June 2011, the prime minister was informed that 41 missing people had returned to their homes, false cases against 38 had been withdrawn and several others had been traced. The PM urged police to trace the missing people and help them to return to their homes.
In 2011, government established a commission which registered 5,369 missing person's complaints. The commission claims to have traced more than 3,600 people. In October 2018, Balochistan National Party (Mengal) (BNP-M) claimed that around 300 missing Baloch persons had returned their homes. Similarly in January 2019, Voice of Baloch Missing People (VBMP) decided to end their suspend their protest after around dozens of returned to their homes. VBMP gave a list of 110 missing people which the VBMP expects the government recover them within two months.

On 29 June 2019, around 200 missing Baloch people were recovered according to Balochistan Home Minister Mir Ziaullah Langove. According to Mir Ziaullah Langove VBMP had provided provincial authorities a list of 250 missing people and that the commission on enforced disappearances was also hearing about 40 cases of missing persons.

Supreme Court orders
The Supreme Court apex court headed by Justice Iqbal decided ordered the government to the grant of subsistence allowance to the affected families. Justice Iqbal advised families not to lose hope. He said the issue of missing persons had become a chronic problem and, therefore, the Commission of Inquiry on Enforced Disappearances, constituted on the orders of the apex court, should be made permanent.

Effect of and remedies for the insurgency

Development issues
The government of Pakistan has repeatedly stated its intention to bring industrialisation to Balochistan, and continues to claim that progress has been made by way of the "Aghaz-e-Haqooq-e-Balochistan" package of political and economic reforms issued in 2009. This is challenged by Baloch nationalist groups, who argue the benefits of these policies have not accrued to native Baloch residents of the province. Baloch nationalist groups continue to highlight the extraction of natural resources, especially natural gas, from the province, without discernible economic benefit to the Baloch people. Nonetheless, the government of Pakistan continues to insist that industrial zones are planned along the new Gawadar-Karachi highway. According to the government, this development is envisaged to bring accelerated progress in the future for the Baloch.

In February 2006 three Chinese engineers assisting in the construction of a local cement factory were shot and killed in an attack on their automobile, while another 11 injured in a car bomb attack by BLA. China recalled its engineers working on the project in Balochistan. The progress in the hydro-power sector has been slow since then.

The people of the region have largely maintained a nomadic lifestyle marked by poverty and illiteracy. The indigenous people are continuously threatened by war and other means of oppression, which have resulted in the loss of thousands of innocent lives over many years. Presently, according to Amnesty International, Baluch activists, politicians and student leaders are among those that are being targeted in forced disappearances, abductions, arbitrary arrests and cases of torture and other ill-treatment.

Economic effects and shortage of skilled workers and goods
The chief minister of the province has said
"A large number of professors, teachers, engineers, barbers and masons are leaving the province for fear of attacks, This inhuman act will push the Baloch nation at least one century back. The Baloch nation will never forgive whoever is involved in target killings... He said the government has approved three university campuses, three medical colleges and hospitals for Turbat, Mastung, Naseerabad and Loralai districts but there was shortage of teachers in the area". Rice traders from Punjab have also been killed in target killing, this has resulting in higher prices of foods items in Balochistan. Almost 40 people of non-Balochi ethnic groups were killed in 2009.

MPA personal development budget
Funding for Balochistan's annual development programme in 2010–11 was R27 billion, as compared to R13 billion in 2007–08. This allowed each Member of the Provincial Assembly of Balochistan a personal development budget of 180 million for his or her constituency, with the figure increasing to 250 million in 2011–2012. However, critics argue that development funding is not a fix for deep political issues, and that MPAs have no incentive to find political solutions with the insurgents when they believe they will receive more funding as long as the insurgency continues. There have also been allegations that MPAs are exploiting the PSDP programme to arrange kickback schemes and other forms of corruption.

Gadani Energy Corridor
Four coal-fired power plants will be built Gadani, creating a power corridor in Balochistan based on the Houston Energy Corridor. This was announced by Prime Minister Nawaz Sharif during a visit to the region. The Gadani Power Park and it is expected to generate 5200 MW. Some nationalist groups objected to the project, saying they had not been consulted and instead favored expanding access to electricity in the province rather than increasing capacity.

Farm subsidy
The Federal government announced it would transfer Rs4 billion subsidy to Provincial Government to be passed onto farmers in Balochistan to promote for tube-wells. The Provincial Government announced it would spend further Rs3 billion to support the Federal Programme. However, high levels of corruption amongst civil servants and senior ministers may mean the common man only gets partial benefit.

Army Education City at Sui
In January 2011 then Chief of Army Staff of Pakistan Army, General Ashfaq Parvez Kayani, announced the establishment of Education City in Sui. The military said it had built colleges in Balochistan, such as Balochistan Institute of Technical Education (BITE) and the Gwadar Institute of Technical Education (GITE) with approximately 1,673 graduates. Around 22,786 Baloch students attend military-run educational institutions.

Notes

References

Bibliography

External links

 Unrest simmers in Pakistan province
 The real Balochistan by Sana Baloch
 Balochistan in focus by Rahimullah Yusufzai
 Ethnicity and Provincialism in Pakistan by Adnan Syed.

Conflicts in 1948
History of Balochistan
 
Insurgencies
Politics of Balochistan, Pakistan
Provincial disputes in Pakistan
Proxy wars
Separatism in Pakistan
20th century in Afghanistan
20th-century conflicts
20th century in Iran
20th century in Pakistan
21st-century conflicts
21st century in Afghanistan
21st century in Iran
21st century in Pakistan
1940s conflicts
1950s conflicts
1960s conflicts
1970s conflicts
1980s conflicts
1990s conflicts
2000s conflicts
2010s conflicts
2020s conflicts